Garanoir is a variety of red wine grape. It was created by André Jaquinet and Dominique Maigre at Station Fédérale de Recherches en Production Végétale de Changins in 1970 by crossing Gamay and Reichensteiner. Garanoir was developed for cultivation in German Switzerland, and is a full sibling of Gamaret, which was intended for the French part of the country.

It is grown in both French and German Switzerland.

Garanoir has relatively good resistance to rot and ripens early. It gives dark purple wines, which are fruitier, lighter and less concentrated than those of Gamaret.

Synonyms
Garanoir is also known under the synonyms B-28, Gastar, Granoir, and Pully B-28.

References

Red wine grape varieties